The Best of the Capitol Years is a 1992 compilation album by American singer Frank Sinatra, consisting of 20 tracks selected from the three-CD box set The Capitol Years, released two years earlier.

Track listing
"I've Got the World on a String" (Harold Arlen, Ted Koehler) - 2:13
"South of the Border" (Jimmy Kennedy, Michael Carr) - 2:52
"I Get a Kick Out of You" (Cole Porter) - 2:52
"Young at Heart" (Carolyn Leigh, Johnny Richards) - 2:50
"Three Coins in the Fountain" (Sammy Cahn, Jule Styne) - 3:07
"What Is This Thing Called Love?" (Porter) - 2:34
"In the Wee Small Hours of the Morning" (Bob Hilliard, David Mann) - 3:00
"Learnin' the Blues" (Dolores Silvers) - 3:04
"Love and Marriage" (Cahn, Jimmy Van Heusen) - 2:38
"(Love Is) The Tender Trap" (Cahn, Van Heusen) - 3:00
"You Make Me Feel So Young" (Josef Myrow, Mack Gordon) - 2:58
"I've Got You Under My Skin" (Porter) - 3:46
"(How Little It Matters) How Little We Know" (Leigh, Phillip Springer) - 2:40
"The Lady Is a Tramp" (Richard Rodgers, Lorenz Hart) - 3:15
"Night and Day" (Porter) - 4:02
"Witchcraft" (Leigh, Cy Coleman) - 2:55
"All the Way" (Cahn, Van Heusen) - 2:55
"Come Fly with Me" (Cahn, Van Heusen) - 3:20
"High Hopes" (Cahn, Van Heusen) - 2:45
"Nice 'n' Easy" (Alan and Marilyn Bergman, Lew Spence) - 2:44

1992 compilation albums
Frank Sinatra compilation albums